Manyame is a constituency of Mashonaland West in Zimbabwe. It is about 40 km from Harare.

See also
 Manyame River
 Manyame Air Basej

Mashonaland West Province
Parliamentary constituencies in Zimbabwe